The 2006–07 Umaglesi Liga was the eighteenth season of top-tier football in Georgia. It began on 26 July 2006 and ended on 20 May 2007. Sioni Bolnisi were the defending champions.

Locations

League standings

Results

Relegation play-offs

See also
2006–07 in Georgian football
2006–07 Pirveli Liga
2006–07 Georgian Cup

References
Georgia - List of final tables (RSSSF)

Erovnuli Liga seasons
1
Georgia